The Nobel Prizes were established according to the will of the Swedish industrialist and inventor, Alfred Nobel and are awarded to individuals who have excelled in the fields of chemistry, physics, physiology or medicine, literature, economics and peace. Since 1951, eleven South African-born individuals have been awarded.

Laureates

Members of laureate organizations
The following South African-based organizations and individuals were significant members who contributed largely in making a larger organization become a Nobel laureate.

Nominations
The first South African nominee for the Nobel Prize was a certain P. B. de Ville who was unsuccessfully recommended twice (in 1930 and 1932) by South African Minister of Health and Social Welfare Karl Bremer (1885–1953). Since then, other South African influential figures and organizations started receiving nominations as well. The following list are the nominees with verified nominations from the Nobel Committee and recognized international organizations. There are also other purported nominees whose nominations are yet to be verified since the archives are revealed 50 years after, among them:
 For Physics: Tikvah Alper (1909–1995), Mike Pentz (1924–1995), Friedel Sellschop (1930–2002), Frank Nabarro (1916–2006), Stanley Mandelstam (1928–2016), Jan H van der Merwe (1922–2016) and George F. R. Ellis (born 1939).
 For Physiology or Medicine: Christiaan Barnard (1922–2001) and Phillip Tobias (1925–2012).
 For Literature: Mary Renault (1905–1983), Laurens van der Post (1906–1996), Es'kia Mphahlele (1919–2008), Dan Jacobson (1929–2014), André Brink (1935–2015), Peter Abrahams (1919–2017), Karel Schoeman (1939–2017), Wilbur Smith (1933–2021), Athol Fugard (born 1932), Breyten Breytenbach (born 1939), Sindiwe Magona (born 1943), Zoë Wicomb (born 1948), Zakes Mda (born 1948), Antjie Krog (born 1952), Ivan Vladislavic (born 1957), Gcina Mhlophe (born 1958) and Damon Galgut (born 1963).
 For Peace: Oliver Tambo (1917–1993), Walter Sisulu (1912–2003), Fatima Meer (1928–2010), Thabo Mbeki (born 1942), Nkosazana Dlamini-Zuma (born 1949), African National Congress (founded in 1912), International Defence and Aid Fund (founded in 1956) and Centre for Human Rights (founded in 1986).

Nominees

Notes

References

External links

Lists of Nobel laureates by nationality
South African Nobel laureates
Lists of South African people